The Bill of Rights commemorative coins are a series of commemorative coins which were issued by the United States Mint in 1993.

Legislation
The James Madison-Bill of Rights Commemorative Coin Act authorized the production of three coins, a clad half dollar, a silver dollar, and a gold half eagle. Congress authorized the coins to commemorate the first ten amendments of the United States Constitution, known as the Bill of Rights. The act allowed the coins to be struck in both proof and uncirculated finishes. The coins were released January 22, 1993.

Designs

Half Dollar

The obverse of the Bill of Rights commemorative half dollar, designed by T. James Ferrell, features James Madison penning the Bill of Rights with Montpelier in the background. The reverse of the coin, designed by Dean McMullen, features the torch of freedom.

Dollar

The obverse of the Bill of Rights commemorative dollar, designed by William Krawczewicz, features a portrait of James Madison. The reverse of the coin, designed by Dean McMullen, features James and Dolley Madison's Virginia home, Montpelier.

Half eagle

The obverse of the Bill of Rights half eagle, designed by Scott R. Blazek, features Madison studying the Bill of Rights, with thirteen stars along the right edge. The reverse of the coin, designed by Joseph D. Pena, features a Madison quote accented by an eagle, the torch of freedom, and a laurel branch.

Specifications
Half Dollar
 Display Box Color: Dark Blue
 Edge: Reeded
 Weight: 12.50 grams
 Diameter: 30.61 millimeters; 1.205 inches
 Composition: 90% silver; 10% copper

Dollar
 Display Box Color: Dark Blue
 Edge: Reeded
 Weight: 26.730 grams; 0.8594 troy ounce
 Diameter: 38.10 millimeters; 1.50 inches
 Composition: 90% Silver, 10% Copper

Half Eagle
 Display Box Color: Dark Blue
 Edge: Reeded
 Weight: 8.359 grams; 0.2687 troy ounce
 Diameter: 21.59 millimeters; 0.850 inch
 Composition: 90% Gold, 3.6% Silver, 6.4% Copper

See also

 United States commemorative coins
 List of United States commemorative coins and medals (1990s)
 United States Constitution Bicentennial coins

References

Commemorative coins of the United States